Sandford Park School is an independent, non-denominational, co-educational secondary school, located in Ranelagh, Dublin, Ireland.  It was founded in 1922.

History 
The school was founded in 1922 by Alfred Le Peton, who served as its first headmaster. He had previously served as joint headmaster of Earlsfort House School alongside Ernest Exshaw. It was decided to move the school from the terraced city-centre property of Earlsfort House to the 2.5 hectare Ranelagh property of Sandford Park, originally designed in 1894 by Thomas Edmund Hudman for James P. Pile, a property developer and Hudman’s brother-in-law. The school was founded as non-denominational, to contrast with the majority of schools in Ireland at the time, which had religious patronages. In its first year of teaching, the school had enrolled fifty-three boys. Le Peton resigned as headmaster in 1925.

In 2013, the school began accepting enrolment for girls in all year groups, and in 2021 there were 429 students attending in total, of whom 171 were girls.

School principals
 Gwynn Seton Bradshaw Mack 1922–1931
 Arthur Douglas Cordner 1934–46
 Major P.G. Wormell 1946–53
 Maurice Wilkins (Acting Headmaster) 1953–54
 Trevor Dagg 1954–1960 [1st period]
 Dr Hector Rex Cathcart 1960–1967
 Trevor Dagg 1967–1980 [2nd period]
 Ian Steepe 1980–1985
 William (Bill) R. Tector 1985–1990
 Dr John Harris 1990–1996
 Michael Whelan 1996–2003
 Edith Byrne 2003–present

Notable past pupils

 Max Abrahamson, internationally renowned construction lawyer
 Jonathan Philbin Bowman, journalist
 Conor Cruise O'Brien, diplomat, Labour Party politician, writer and academic
 Justin Keating, politician and former Labour Party cabinet minister
 Graham Knuttel, painter and sculptor
 Ham Lambert, international cricketer, rugby player and rugby referee
 Charles Mellon, first-class cricketer
 John Neill, Church of Ireland Archbishop of Dublin 2002–2011
 Owen Sheehy-Skeffington, socialist and pacifist
 Patrick Rooke (born 1955), Bishop of Tuam, Killala, and Achonry

Past pupils Union
The Sandford Union was inaugurated in the 1930s, to enable past pupils to keep in touch with one another and the school itself.   The Sandford Union hold several events during the year culminating in the annual dinner held every year on the fourth Friday in November.

References

External links
Sandford Park School website
 Sandford Park Union

Ranelagh
Secondary schools in Dublin (city)
Private schools in the Republic of Ireland
Educational institutions established in 1922
 
1922 establishments in Ireland